The Bukit Barisan or the Barisan Mountains are a mountain range on the western side of Sumatra, Indonesia, covering nearly 1,700 km (1,050 mi) from the north to the south of the island. The Bukit Barisan range consists primarily of volcanoes shrouded in dense jungle cover, including Sumatran tropical pine forests on the higher slopes. The highest peak of the range is Mount Kerinci at 3,800 metres (12,467 ft). The Bukit Barisan Selatan National Park is situated towards the southern end of the range Liwa, Indonesia.

The name Bukit Barisan actually means "row of hills" or "hills that make a row" in Malay, for the range stretches end to end along the island of Sumatra.

There are 35 active volcanoes in Bukit Barisan. The largest volcano is the supervolcano Toba within the 100 km (62 miles) × 30 km (19 miles) Lake Toba, which was created after a caldera collapse (est. in 74,000 Before Present). The eruption is estimated to have been at level eight on the VEI scale, the largest possible for a volcanic eruption.

List of volcanoes
The following list is sourced from the Smithsonian Institution's Global Volcanism Program.

Inactive volcanoes
The following list is sourced from the Study Archaeology

See also
 List of volcanoes in Indonesia
 Kodam I/Bukit Barisan

References

Mountain ranges of Indonesia
Volcanoes of Sumatra